Pandolfo Reschi (1643–1699) was a painter who was born at Danzig (now Gdańsk) and active in Italy.

He moved to Italy when he was young, and became one of the ablest pupils of Giacomo Borgognone. He painted battle-pieces  and imitated the landscapes of Salvator Rosa. He also excelled in painting perspective and architectural views (quadratura).

References

External links

1643 births
1699 deaths
Artists from Gdańsk
17th-century Italian painters
Italian male painters
Italian Baroque painters
Italian battle painters